Parapet Peak is located at southern end of Mount Robson Provincial Park on the border of Alberta and British Columbia. It was named in 1921 by Cyril G. Wates.


Climate
Based on the Köppen climate classification, the mountain is located in a subarctic climate with cold, snowy winters, and mild summers. However, these months coincide with mosquito season, which requires effective defenses. Precipitation runoff from the mountain drains into tributaries of the Athabasca River on its east side, and the headwaters of the Fraser River from the west side.

See also
 List of peaks on the British Columbia–Alberta border

References

External links
Bennington Peak with Parapet Peak (right): Flickr (photo) 

Mountains of Jasper National Park
Three-thousanders of Alberta
Three-thousanders of British Columbia
Canadian Rockies
Mount Robson Provincial Park